This List of governors of Équateur (former province) includes governors of the former province of Équateur/Evenaar, created in the Belgian Congo on 20 August 1917.
It also includes commissioners of the Équateur District, created in 1888 in the Congo Free State, the precursor of the province.

In a 1933 reorganization Équateur was renamed Coquilhatville/Coquilhatstad province, losing an area in the south roughly equivalent to the present Mai-Ndombe to the new Léopoldville province. 
On 27 May 1947 the province regained the name of Équateur/Evenaar.
It became an autonomous province of the Congo republic on 30 June 1960.

On 14 August 1962 Équateur was split into the provinces of Cuvette Centrale, Ubangi, and a centrally administered portion that became Moyen-Congo on 5 February 1963.
On 25 April 1966 Cuvette Centrale, Moyen-Congo and Ubangi were reunited as Équateur province.
On 11 July 2015 Équateur was split into the present provinces of Équateur, Mongala, Nord-Ubangi, Sud-Ubangi and Tshuapa.

Équateur Station (1883–1888)

Équateur Station, which would become the present city of Mbandaka, was established for the International African Association by Alphonse van Gèle and Camille Coquilhat in 1883 on the left bank of the Congo River below the mouth of the Ruki River.
The station heads were:
 Alphonse van Gèle (1883–1884), 
 Guillaume Casman (December 1884 – May 1885)
 Georges-Guillaume Pagels (May–June 1885)
 Camille Van den Plas (1 July 1885)
 Edward James Glave (December 1885) 
 Georges-Guillaume Pagels (March–April 1886)
At the end of 1885 Charles Liebrechts was made responsible for the Équateur region. 
In 1888, Guillaume François Van Kerkoven commanded the two districts of Ubangi-Uele and Équateur.

District of Équateur (1888–1917)

The district commissioners were:

First Équateur Province governors (1917–1962)

The governors (or equivalent) of the first Équateur Province from 1917 to 1962 were:

Temporary successors (1962–1966)

The governors (or equivalent) of Cuvette Centrale, Ubangi and Moyen-Congo between 1962 and 1966 were:

Cuvette Centrale

Moyen-Congo

Ubangi

Reunited Équateur Province governors (1966–2015)

The governors (or equivalent) of the united Équateur Province from 1966 until it was split up in 2015 were:

See also
Lists of provincial governors of the Democratic Republic of the Congo

Notes

References